Shun Hing Square, also known as "Di Wang Tower" is a -tall skyscraper in Shenzhen, Guangdong province, China. Upon its completion in 1996, it became the tallest building in China, until being surpassed by CITIC Plaza next year.

Background
The building was built at a pace of four floors in nine days. The main tower contains office space, a car park and a 5-story shopping arcade complex with four sets of escalators, five passenger lifts and two service lifts, and a floor area ranging from 3450 m2 to 4900 m2. On the top floor (69th floor) is the "Meridian View Center," an observation deck.
Its common nickname, "Diwang Building" derives from the auction price for the piece of land it stands being the most expensive in Shenzhen at the time. 24,500 tonnes of steel were used in construction.

Records held
Currently, the building is 
 The fifth tallest in Shenzhen
 20th tallest building in mainland China
 44th tallest in the world
 The tallest building in the world with fewer than 70 floors 
 The tallest all-steel building in China. 
 The tallest building in China from 1996 to the completion of CITIC Plaza in Guangzhou in 1997.
 The first skyscraper in China to be one of the ten tallest in the world (Bank of China Tower and Central Plaza, of Hong Kong, were constructed and topped out while Hong Kong was still under British sovereignty). 
 The first in China to reach .
 Tallest building constructed in Shenzhen in the 1990s.
 Tallest building in Shenzhen from 1996 to September 2011 until surpassed by the nearby  Kingkey 100.

Image gallery

See also

List of tallest buildings in Shenzhen
List of tallest structures in China
 List of tallest buildings in the world

References

External links
 Shun Hing Square on CTBUH Skyscraper Center
 Meridian View Center observation deck video
 

Skyscraper office buildings in Shenzhen
Buildings and structures completed in 1996
Retail buildings in China
Skyscrapers in Shenzhen